The Journal of Eukaryotic Microbiology is a peer-reviewed scientific journal covering all aspects of eukaryotic microbiology. The journal publishes research on protists, including lower algae and fungi.

According to the Journal Citation Reports, the journal has a 2021 impact factor of 3.880.

Abstracting and indexing 
The journal is abstracting and indexing by various services for example:

 Abstracts in Anthropology (Sage)
 Abstracts on Hygiene & Communicable Diseases (CABI)
 Academic Search (EBSCO Publishing)
 Academic Search Premier (EBSCO Publishing)
 AgBiotech News & Information (CABI)
 AgBiotechNet (CABI)
 AGRICOLA Database (National Agricultural Library)
 Animal Breeding Abstracts (CABI)
 Biocontrol News & Information (CABI)
 Biological & Agricultural Index Plus (EBSCO Publishing)
 Biological Abstracts (Clarivate Analytics)
 BIOSIS Previews (Clarivate Analytics)

References

External links 

 

English-language journals
Microbiology journals